born October 18, 1975 in Noda, Chiba, Japan is a Japanese voice actor.

Voice roles

Anime
Allison & Lillia as Air-traffic controller (ep 21); Audience (ep 8); Cabin crew B (ep 10); Chauffeur (ep 12); Ed (ep 23–26); Jan (ep 5–6,14,18-19); Maintenance chief (ep 7); Man B (ep 15–16); Pilot (ep 17); Radio voice (ep 13); Soldier (ep 11); Soldiers (ep 3); Subordinate (ep 4)
Beyblade Burst God as Jango Matador
Gintama as Private (Ep. 109); Shinsengumi Member C (Ep. 105)
Hetalia - Axis Powers as Holy Roman Empire
Inazuma Eleven as Asuka Domon, Usui, Tsutomu Gokuhi, Wataru Henmi, Shin'ichiro Toyama, Jin Kosaka, Seiya Yukino, Juzo Nata, Taisho Kakita, Ryota Tori, Kaiji Hamano, Ichiban Kita, Banda Koloogyu
Linebarrels of Iron as Makoto Domyouji
Macross Frontier as Congressman (ep 23); Keitai-kun (ep 1,4-5); Man (ep 3); Minister's secretary (ep 22); Mishima's subordinate (ep 8); New U.N. Spacy pilot (ep 17); Operator (ep 24); Pilot (ep 14); Radar person (ep 13); Reporter (ep 6); Reporter A (ep 9); Secretary (ep 10–11); SP (ep 20); Storekeeper (ep 18); Teacher (ep 16); Temjin (ep 12); Young man (ep 15,25)
Mobile Suit Gundam 00 as Joshua Edwards (eps 14–15)
Sengoku Basara: Samurai Kings series as Bunshichi
To Love-Ru as Alien A (ep 17); Arts teacher (ep 3); Delinquent (ep 8); Ikemen-senpai (ep 20); Irogama (ep 11); Junior A (ep 12); Male student (ep 4,24); Man (ep 16); Math teacher (ep 18); Mauru; Pilot (ep 25); Reporter B (ep 19); Soccer player (ep 14); Student (ep 22); Subordinate (ep 7)
Diabolik Lovers as Richter

Games
Inazuma Eleven 2 (2009) as Asuka Domon
Inazuma Eleven 3 (2010) as Asuka Domon
Inazuma Eleven Strikers (2011) as Asuka Domon, Wataru Henmi, Gocker, Metron, Zagomel Zande
Inazuma Eleven Strikers 2012 Xtreme (2011) as Asuka Domon, Wataru Henmi, Gocker, Metron, Zagomel Zande, Kaiji Hamano, Kai
Inazuma Eleven GO (2011) as Kaiji Hamano, Ichiban Kita, Wanda Naoto, Shirosaki Katsuya, Oshii Tsuyoshi, 
Diabolik Lovers (2012) as Richter
Inazuma Eleven GO 2: Chrono Stone (2012) as Kaiji Hamano
Inazuma Eleven GO Strikers 2013 (2012) as Asuka Domon, Wataru Henmi, Gocker, Metron, Zagomel Zande, Kaiji Hamano, Kai, Ichiban Kita, Wanda Naoto, Rasetsu
Super Robot Wars UX (2013) as Makoto Domyouji
Inazuma Eleven GO: Galaxy (2013) as Funaki Hiromasa, Kaiji Hamano, Banda Koloogyu

Dubbing

Movies
 Stonewall as Ray/Ramona (Jonny Beauchamp)

Animation
 Iron Man: Armored Adventures as Iron Man

See also
 
 Jun Konno at Jun Konno @ Production baobab

References

Living people
Japanese male voice actors
1975 births
People from Noda, Chiba
Male voice actors from Chiba Prefecture
21st-century Japanese male actors
Production Baobab voice actors